Skylab II is a live album by the Brazilian musician Rogério Skylab, the second in his series of ten eponymous, numbered albums. His first ever live album, it was self-released in 2000 and recorded during a gig at the Hipódromo Up in Rio de Janeiro in the same year. Löis Lancaster, vocalist of now-defunct experimental rock band Zumbi do Mato (one of Skylab's greatest influences), was a guest musician on the album, providing additional vocals for the track "Samba". Nine years later, Lancaster would return for Skylab IX. The album is considered one of Skylab's finest by fans and critics alike, and the songs "Convento das Carmelitas" and "Carrocinha de Cachorro-Quente" became set list regulars. A studio re-recording of "Cu e Boca" eventually appeared on Skylab VI; "Ato Falho" and "Música Suave" were re-recorded for Caos e Cosmos, Vol. 2 in 2022.

The album can be downloaded from Skylab's official website.

Background
After working with famous producer Robertinho do Recife on Skylab I and feeling unsatisfied with the final product, Skylab decided to take on production of his subsequent releases himself, in order to obtain greater creative control – something he claimed he didn't have while working on Skylab I, hence his unsatisfaction. As a result, he once stated that he prefers Skylab II over its predecessor, under the pretext that "[Skylab II] is 100% Skylab. [Skylab I] was 80% Robertinho".

Critical reception
Blog Disco Furado gave the album a positive review, saying that "while on his first album Skylab seemed restrained by Robertinho do Recife's production, it is on this one he could showcase the pungency his lyrics needed". It also called Skylab's backing band "excellent".

Website La Cumbuca included Skylab II in 24th place in its list of the Top 200 Brazilian Albums of the 2000s. Skylab IV, V and VII were also featured on the list, in 42nd, 71st and 110th place, respectively.

Track listing

Personnel
 Rogério Skylab – vocals, production
 Wlad – bass guitar
 Alexandre Guichard – classical guitar
 Marcelo B. – drums
 Alexandre BG – electric guitar
 Löis Lancaster – additional vocals, trombone (track 17)
 Solange Venturi – photography
 Flávio Lazarino – cover art
 Bienvenido – technical operator

References

2000 live albums
Rogério Skylab albums
Self-released albums
Sequel albums
Obscenity controversies in music
Albums free for download by copyright owner